The Javan crow (Euploea gamelia) is a species of nymphalid butterfly in the Danainae subfamily. It is endemic to Indonesia.

References

Euploea
Butterflies of Indonesia
Endemic fauna of Indonesia
Fauna of Java
Butterflies described in 1825
Taxonomy articles created by Polbot
Taxa named by Jacob Hübner